Corte Palasio is a town and comune in the province of Lodi, in Lombardy (northern Italy).

References

Cities and towns in Lombardy